The Friends' School, Hobart is an independent co-educational Quaker day and boarding school located in North Hobart, a suburb of Hobart, Tasmania, Australia.

Founded in 1887 by Quakers, the school currently caters for approximately 1330 students from pre-kindergarten to Year 12, including 47 boarders from Years 7 to 12. It is the largest Quaker school in the world.

Friends' is affiliated with the Association of Independent Schools of Tasmania (AIST), the Junior School Heads Association of Australia (JSHAA), the Association of Heads of Independent Schools of Australia (AHISA), the Australian Boarding Schools' Association (ABSA), and is a member of the Sports Association of Tasmanian Independent Schools (SATIS).

History 

The Friends' School opened at 60–62 Warwick Street, Hobart (the building still stands) on 31 January 1887 under the control of the Religious Society of Friends (Quakers). It was opened by Samuel Clemes.  The initial enrolment of 33 expanded so rapidly that the School moved to its present site in Commercial Road on 28 January 1889, a move made possible by the generous loan of A$4,000 from Hobart Baptists. The first headmaster was Samuel Clemes, considered to be a remarkable reformer in education for his belief in co-education. In 1900 he resigned and set up his own family school, Leslie House, (later renamed Clemes College) in Pirie Street and then at Boa Vista, Argyle Street, where Morris Friends' Primary Years (Junior School) and Clemes (Years 11–12) are now located. Clemes College and The Friends' School came together in 1946.

1923 marked the beginning of a new era in the School's history. On 28 September, the control of the school passed from London Quakers to a committee in Hobart and a week later Ernest Unwin arrived, under whose leadership the School made remarkable progress. In this period the distinctive appearance of the School changed - with the addition of the front portico, the Hodgkin Hall, the original science and art block and the boys' boarding wing. No further building programmes were undertaken until 1955 when the second period of expansion began with the opening of the Preparatory School in 1955 followed by the Sports Ground in 1958. Building on the Commercial Road site began in 1962 with the opening of the Unwin Memorial Science and Art block, continued in the 70s with the Library, the Asten Theatre, additional science facilities and in the 80s with the W.N. Oats Sports Centre. The Clemes Memorial Library in the Junior School was erected from the old Clemes Assembly Hall in 1986.  The addition of the multipurpose Farrall Centre to the Junior School was completed in late 2011.

Despite being a Quaker school, there are no more than 10 Quaker staff at the school, and few of the students are actually Quakers.  However Quaker activities, such as meeting for worship (Gathering), form an integral part of school life for students, and take up one hour per week.

Sherwood
Following the Tasman Bridge disaster of 1975 many students of the school who lived on the eastern shore of the Derwent River became isolated, and were unable to attend.

Whilst older students were trusted to make the ferry crossing from Bellerive to Hobart, for younger students it was not deemed safe to do so unsupervised. Appeals were made to the school from concerned parents, and eventually, it was decided to build a temporary campus within the City of Clarence. A site was located in bushland above Lindisfarne and a small area was set aside for the campus.

The Sherwood campus consisted of two main inter-linked buildings, a playground, a crude gravel oval and a large area of undeveloped bushland. The school only catered for pupils from kindergarten to grade 2, as it was considered older pupils were old enough to catch transport to the main campus.

One of the features of the education system at Sherwood was the regular "nature walks" in which students from every year group would participate in regular excursions into the nearby sclerophyll bushland and learn to understand, appreciate, and get in better touch with nature.

It closed just a few years after opening.

Principals
Complete list of School Principals:

Structure

The Friends' School consists of three main parts: Morris Friends' Primary Years, High School and Clemes. Morris has approximately 430 students from Kindergarten to Year 6 and is situated in the Argyle Street Campus. The High School has 550 students from Year 7 to 10 and is in the Commercial Road campus. Clemes has approximately 300 students in Years 11 and 12 and is in the Argyle Street campus.

The school owns a sports complex at Bell Street, with facilities for AFL, cricket, hockey, softball, and soccer; Friends' Health and Fitness off Elizabeth Street; and Friends' Early Years on Argyle Street. The school has a state-of-the-art rowing facility in Lutana, near the main campuses.

For class allocation and internal competition, all students at Friends' are assigned to "Houses". The primary school houses are Benson, Cadbury, and Cooper. In the secondary, Mather, Ransome, Unwin, and Hodgkin make up the houses.

All students in the high school are members of tutor groups, each of which consists of approximately four people from each grade. All members of a tutor group are from the same house, and each house has eight tutor groups.

Sport 
The Friends' School is a member of the Sports Association of Tasmanian Independent Schools (SATIS).

SATIS premierships 
The Friends' School has won the following SATIS premierships.

Cross Country (3) - 1963, 1964, 2006, 2013, 2014, 2015, 2017, 2018, 2019, 2021
 Hockey (15) - 1965, 1968, 1969, 1970, 1971, 1975, 1996, 2000, 2006, 2007, 2008, 2010, 2011, 2012, 2013
 Rowing (6) - 1999, 2000, 2001, 2002, 2009, 2019
 Rowing Eight (14) - 1932, 1933, 1939, 1949, 1950, 1958, 1959, 1960, 1961, 1962, 1968, 1975, 2001, 2003
 Soccer (2) - 2004, 2010
 Swimming - 2004
 Tennis (2) - 2014, 2018

Notable alumni 
Edmund Leolin Piesse - Director of Military Intelligence 1916–1919 and Head of the Pacific Branch of the Prime Minister's Department 1919–1923
Elizabeth Robyn Mason – Director of the Australasian Medical Publishing Company Pty Ltd (also attended the Presbyterian Ladies' College, Melbourne)
Kim Santow – New South Wales Supreme Court judge and Chancellor of the University of Sydney

Paul Calvert - Politician
Oliver O'Halloran - The youngest person to fly around Australia solo and unassisted. (2017)

Entertainment and the arts
Errol Flynn – Hollywood actor
Amali Ward – Australian Idol contestant/singer
Freya Stafford – Actress
Christopher Koch - Writer
Dennis Altman - Academic and writer

Sport
 Samuel Beltz - Olympic & world champion rower
Caryn Davies - Olympic rower & two-time Olympic Champion
 Kerry Hore - Olympic & world champion rower
 Kate Hornsey - Olympic rower
Meaghan Volker - Olympic rower
 Erik Rowan - World champion rower
Eddie Ockenden - National Hockey Player
Max Walker – Cricketer and Australian footballer
Hanny Allston - World Champion Orienteer

See also
 List of schools in Tasmania
List of boarding schools
 Education in Tasmania

References

External links 
 The Friends' School website

Boarding schools in Tasmania
Educational institutions established in 1887
High schools in Hobart
International Baccalaureate schools in Australia
Junior School Heads Association of Australia Member Schools
Private schools in Hobart
Quaker schools
1887 establishments in Australia
North Hobart, Tasmania